Crenshaw County is a county located in the south central portion of the U.S. state of Alabama. It is located immediately south of the Montgomery metropolitan area. As of the 2020 census, the population was 13,194. Its county seat is Luverne. Its name is in honor of an Alabama judge, Anderson Crenshaw.

History
Crenshaw County was established after the American Civil War on November 30, 1866, by the Reconstruction era legislature. It was formed from parts of Butler, Coffee, Covington, Pike and Lowndes counties. While part of the coastal area, this county had relatively infertile soils, limiting cotton and other agriculture. Its planters used enslaved African Americans for all needed types of labor. Many of their descendants stayed in the area, and nearly one-quarter of the county population is African American.

Crenshaw County became a center of timbering in the Piney Wood region, especially after the Montgomery and Florida Railroad Company constructed a line through the county in 1886. This provided transport to markets for timber. It connected with Sprague Junction in Montgomery County, Alabama. The timber camps were rough work areas where racial tensions sometimes flared.

Geography
The county is located in the Gulf Coastal Plain region of the state. Much of the land is also covered by forests that are used for logging.

Major highways
 U.S. Highway 29
 U.S. Highway 331
 State Route 10
 State Route 97
 State Route 106
 State Route 141
 State Route 189

Adjacent counties
Montgomery County (north)
Pike County (east)
Coffee County (southeast)
Covington County (south)
Butler County (west)
Lowndes County (northwest)

Demographics

2000 census
As of the census of 2000, there were 13,665 people, 5,577 households, and 3,892 families living in the county.  The population density was 22 people per square mile (9/km2).  There were 6,644 housing units at an average density of 11 per square mile (4/km2).  The racial makeup of the county was 73.82% White, 24.79% Black or African American, 0.37% Native American, 0.11% Asian, 0.01% Pacific Islander, 0.20% from other races, and 0.70% from two or more races.  0.64% of the population were Hispanic or Latino of any race.

There were 5,577 households, out of which 31.00% had children under the age of 18 living with them, 50.70% were married couples living together, 15.40% had a female householder with no husband present, and 30.20% were non-families. 28.20% of all households were made up of individuals, and 14.70% had someone living alone who was 65 years of age or older.  The average household size was 2.42 and the average family size was 2.96.

In the county, the population was spread out, with 24.70% under the age of 18, 7.90% from 18 to 24, 26.30% from 25 to 44, 23.90% from 45 to 64, and 17.10% who were 65 years of age or older.  The median age was 39 years. For every 100 females there were 89.80 males.  For every 100 females age 18 and over, there were 83.60 males.

The median income for a household in the county was $26,054, and the median income for a family was $31,724. Males had a median income of $27,286 versus $17,703 for females. The per capita income for the county was $14,565.  About 18.60% of families and 22.10% of the population were below the poverty line, including 28.30% of those under age 18 and 23.50% of those age 65 or over.

2010 census
As of the census of 2010, there were 13,906 people, 5,652 households, and 3,882 families living in the county.  The population density was 23 people per square mile (9/km2).  There were 6,735 housing units at an average density of 11 per square mile (4/km2).  The racial makeup of the county was 72.6% White, 23.4% Black or African American, 0.4% Native American, 1.4% Asian, 0.1% Pacific Islander, 0.7% from other races, and 1.5% from two or more races. 1.5% of the population were Hispanic or Latino of any race.

There were 5,652 households, out of which 27.3% had children under the age of 18 living with them, 48.7% were married couples living together, 15.6% had a female householder with no husband present, and 31.3% were non-families. 28.1% of all households were made up of individuals, and 11.9% had someone living alone who was 65 years of age or older.  The average household size was 2.44 and the average family size was 2.97.

In the county, the population was spread out, with 23.8% under the age of 18, 8.0% from 18 to 24, 23.6% from 25 to 44, 28.7% from 45 to 64, and 15.9% who were 65 years of age or older. The median age was 40.7 years. For every 100 females there were 93.4 males.  For every 100 females age 18 and over, there were 95.3 males.

The median income for a household in the county was $35,140, and the median income for a family was $47,685. Males had a median income of $35,598 versus $22,410 for females. The per capita income for the county was $19,793. About 13.7% of families and 17.7% of the population were below the poverty line, including 25.5% of those under age 18 and 16.7% of those age 65 or over.

The largest self-reported ancestry groups in Crenshaw County were English (64.5%), German (12.1%), Irish (11.2%), Italian (3.9%), "American" (3.1%), Scottish (2.9%) and Portuguese (1.8%).

2020 census

As of the 2020 United States census, there were 13,194 people, 4,943 households, and 3,384 families residing in the county.

Government
Crenshaw County is reliably Republican at the presidential level. The last Democrat to win the county in a presidential election is Bill Clinton, who won it by a plurality in 1996.

Communities

City
Luverne (county seat)

Towns
Brantley
Dozier
Glenwood
Petrey
Rutledge

Unincorporated communities

 Fullers Crossroads
 Highland Home
 Honoraville
 Lapine (partly in Montgomery County)
 Moodys Crossroads
 Mulberry
 Panola
 Social Town
 Theba
 Weedville

See also
National Register of Historic Places listings in Crenshaw County, Alabama
Properties on the Alabama Register of Landmarks and Heritage in Crenshaw County, Alabama

References

 

 
1866 establishments in Alabama
Populated places established in 1866